Miss Universe Australia 2018 was the 14th Miss Universe Australia pageant, held on June 28, 2018 at Sofitel Melbourne on Collins, Melbourne, Victoria. Olivia Rogers of South Australia crowned her successor Francesca Hung of New South Wales at the end of the event.

Results

Placements

Special Awards

Delegates

Meet the 33 national delegates competing for the title of Miss Universe Australia 2018:

References

External links
Official Website

2018
2010s in Sydney
2018 beauty pageants